In phonetics, labiodentals are consonants articulated with the lower lip and the upper teeth.

Labiodental consonants in the IPA
The labiodental consonants identified by the International Phonetic Alphabet are:

The IPA chart shades out labiodental lateral consonants. This is sometimes read as indicating that such sounds are not possible. In fact, the fricatives  and  often have lateral airflow, but no language makes a distinction for centrality, and the allophony is not noticeable.

The labiodental click is an allophonic variant of the (bi)labial click.

Occurrence
The only common labiodental sounds to occur phonemically are the fricatives and the approximant. The labiodental flap occurs phonemically in over a dozen languages, but it is restricted geographically to central and southeastern Africa (Olson & Hajek 2003). With most other manners of articulation, the norm are bilabial consonants (which together with labiodentals, form the class of labial consonants).

It has been reported to occur phonemically in a dialect of Teke, but similar claims in the past have proven spurious.

The XiNkuna dialect of Tsonga features a pair of affricates as phonemes. In some other languages, such as Xhosa, affricates may occur as allophones of the fricatives. These differ from the German voiceless labiodental affricate <pf>, which commences with a bilabial p. All these affricates are rare sounds.

The stops are not confirmed to exist as separate phonemes in any language. They are sometimes written as ȹ ȸ (qp and db ligatures). They may also be found in children's speech or as speech impediments.

consonants
Dentolabial consonants are the articulatory opposite of labiodentals: They are pronounced by contacting lower teeth against the upper lip. They are rare cross-linguistically, likely due to the prevalence of dental malocclusions (especially retrognathism) that make them difficult to produce, though one allophone of Swedish  has been described as a velarized dentolabial fricative, and the voiceless dentolabial fricative is apparently used in some of the southwestern dialects of Greenlandic (Vebæk 2006).

The diacritic for dentolabial in the extensions of the IPA for disordered speech is a superscript bridge, by analogy with the subscript bridge used for labiodentals: . Complex consonants such as affricates, prenasalized stops and the like are also possible.

See also
 Place of articulation
 List of phonetics topics

References

Olson, Kenneth S. & John Hajek. 2003. Crosslinguistic insights on the labial flap. Linguistic Typology 7(2). 157–186. 
Vebæk, Mâliâraq. 2006. The southernmost People of Greenland-Dialects and Memories (Vol. 337): Qavaat-Oqalunneri Eqqaamassaallu. Museum Tusculanum Press.

Further reading

Place of articulation